Wang Xianzhi may refer to:

 Wang Xianzhi (calligrapher) (344–386), influential calligrapher of the Jin dynasty
 Wang Xianzhi (rebel) (died 878), major rebel of the Tang dynasty